The Thi Lo Su Waterfall (also spelt as  Thee Lor Sue, The Lor Sue, Thee Lor Sue or Te-law-zue; lit: Black Waterfall) is claimed to be the largest and highest waterfall in Thailand.

The waterfall has apparently never been surveyed, so the figures given are approximate.

Access to the waterfall campsite by private vehicles has been stopped. It is now only accessible via a cartel of pickups.
Private vehicles have to be parked in Umphang.

References

Waterfalls of Thailand
Geography of Tak province
Dawna Range